Señoras del (h)AMPA is a Spanish dark comedy television series produced by Mediaset España and Producciones Mandarina. Created, written and directed by Carlos del Hoyo and Abril Zamora, it stars Toni Acosta, Malena Alterio, Nuria Herrero and Mamen García. The first season aired on Telecinco in 2019, yet the first part of the second season was released in exclusive by Amazon Prime Video.

Premise 
Four women meet at the sessions of the AMPA (the conventional name for the interest groups of the students' parents and legal guardians in the Spanish education centres): Mayte (Toni Acosta); a seller of food processors, Lourdes (Malena Alterio), dedicated to processing identity cards at the neighborhood's police station; Virginia (Nuria Herrero), a young pregnant woman; and Amparo (Mamen García), an old woman taking care of her grandson. They casually got involved in an involuntary homicide that prompts them to ramp up in their criminal activities.

A substantial part of the fiction takes place in the streets of Carabanchel, Madrid.

Cast 

Introduced in Season 2
 Pilar Castro as Belinda Chamorro.

Production and release 
The series was produced by Mediaset España and Producciones Mandarina. It was created, written and directed by Carlos del Hoyo and Abril Zamora. Filming of the first season started in Madrid by July 2018.

The executive producers are Carlos del Hoyo, Santi Botello and Arantxa Écija.

The series was selected as the buyers' favourite out of 10 series pre-screened at the MIPDrama Summit during 2019 Cannes' MIPTV fair.

The first episode aired on 19 June 2019 on Telecinco and it earned a great free-to-air viewership, attracting 2,996,000 viewers and seizing a 20.9% share of the audience in prime time, becoming the most watched new fiction release in Telecinco in the season.

Filming for the second season started in October 2019. Pilar Castro, Mariola Fuentes and Julia Molins were added to the cast. Belgian RTBF, Brazilian Globosat, Latin-American OnDIRECTV and German Mediengruppe RTL Deutschland TVNOW broadcasters reached agreements with the Spanish distributor Mediterráneo Mediaset España Group to air the series in their respective markets, whereas rights for the adaptation of the series were purchased in Italy, Greece, Romania and Hungary.

The first part of the second season was eventually released on Amazon Prime Video on 16 October 2020. By late 2020, with the second part of the second season pending for release, the creator Carlos del Hoyo reported that they were working for the wrap-up of the series with a third and final season. The free-to-air release of season 2 was programmed by Telecinco for 26 April 2021, performing very poorly in the first episode (6.3% audience share). It was thus relocated from Telecinco to Cuatro and from Monday to Wednesday.
In May 2021, NBC ordered a pilot for an US adaptation written by Janine Sherman Barrois, Dangerous Moms.

Season 1

Season 2

Awards and nominations

References 

Telecinco network series
Spanish-language Amazon Prime Video original programming
2019 Spanish television series debuts
2010s black comedy television series
2020s black comedy television series
Television shows filmed in Spain
2010s Spanish comedy television series
2020s Spanish comedy television series
Spanish crime comedy television series
2021 Spanish television series endings
Television series by Producciones Mandarina
Television shows set in Madrid